Travis Boyd (born September 14, 1993) is an American professional ice hockey forward for the Arizona Coyotes of the National Hockey League (NHL).  Boyd was selected in the 6th round, 177th overall, by the Washington Capitals in the 2011 NHL Entry Draft.

Playing career
Boyd played four collegiate seasons of NCAA Division I hockey with the Minnesota Golden Gophers in the Big Ten Conference. With the Gophers, Boyd won a Big Ten Championship in the 2014–15 season, and was named to the Big Ten second All-Star team for that same season. At the age of 17, he became the youngest player drafted in the 2011 NHL Entry Draft when he was selected 177th overall by the Washington Capitals.

On March 31, 2015, the Washington Capitals signed Boyd to a two-year, entry-level contract, beginning in the 2015–16 season. Boyd signed a tryout agreement for the Capitals' American Hockey League (AHL) affiliate, the Hershey Bears, for the remainder of the 2014–15 season. He played two games for the Bears, registering a goal and an assist. Boyd re-signed with the Capitals on July 5, 2017. He made his NHL debut on December 4, 2017, due to injuries to the Capitals regular line up. He recorded his first career NHL point against the Philadelphia Flyers on March 18, 2018. He won the Stanley Cup with the Capitals on June 7, 2018. He finished the season with 8 games, registering the one point and played in one playoff game.

On July 1, the Capitals re-signed Boyd to a two-year contract with an average annual value of $800,000. Despite suffering an injury in the preseason, Boyd began the 2018–19 season in the NHL. Boyd scored his first NHL goal on December 9 in a 4–0 win over the Columbus Blue Jackets on a pass from team captain Alex Ovechkin. He played in 24 games recording 10 points during the regular season. However, his poor play during the playoffs saw him scratched after game 2 versus the New York Islanders. At the end of the season, the Capitals did not extend a qualifying offer to Boyd and he became an unrestricted free agent.

As a free agent, Boyd signed a one-year, $700,000 contract with the Toronto Maple Leafs on October 10, 2020. During the pandemic-shorted 2020–21 season Boyd scored 3 goals and registered 8 points in 20 games with the Maple Leafs. The Maple Leafs attempted to transfer Boyd to the taxi squad near the trade deadline, forcing them to put him on waivers. On March 22, 2021, Boyd was claimed off waivers by the Vancouver Canucks. He played in 19 games with the Canucks scoring 2 goals.

On August 3, 2021, Boyd signed as a free agent to a one-year, $750,000 contract with the Arizona Coyotes. Boyd was considered a depth forward on his previous teams and was not considered a top forward upon joining the Coyotes. However, on the Coyotes he played on the top power play unit. During the pandemic-shortened 2021–22 season, Boyd scored 10 goals and 34 points in 46 games. On March 5, 2022, Boyd signed a two-year, $3.5 million contract to stay with the Coyotes.

Personal life
Boyd and his wife Kelsey have one daughter together.

Career statistics

Regular season and playoffs

International

Awards and honours

References

External links
 

1993 births
Living people
American men's ice hockey centers
Arizona Coyotes players
Hershey Bears players
Hopkins High School alumni
Ice hockey players from Minnesota
Minnesota Golden Gophers men's ice hockey players
Stanley Cup champions
Toronto Maple Leafs players
USA Hockey National Team Development Program players
Vancouver Canucks players
Washington Capitals draft picks
Washington Capitals players